H. G. Nelson may refer to:

 Harold George Nelson (1881–1947), former member of the Australian House of Representatives
 Greig Pickhaver, who uses the pseudonym HG Nelson, member of the Australian comedy duo Roy and HG